Berg is a town in the district of Bruck an der Leitha in Lower Austria in Austria. It, along with neighboring Wolfsthal were part of the municipality of Wolfsthal-Berg until 1996.

There is a border crossing into Slovakia, with the Bratislava suburb of Petržalka across the border. Since December 21, 2007, no more checks are conducted at the crossing with Slovakia joining the Schengen Area.

Geography
Berg lies in the foothills of the Hundsheimer mountains, at the foot of the Königswarte (344 m).

References

Cities and towns in Bruck an der Leitha District
Austria–Slovakia border crossings